Nicola Ann Spaldin (born 1969) FRS is Professor of Materials Theory at ETH Zurich, known for her pioneering research on multiferroics.

Education and early life
A native of Sunderland, Tyne and Wear, England, Spaldin earned a Bachelor of Arts degree in Natural Sciences from the University of Cambridge in 1991, and a PhD in chemistry from the University of California, Berkeley in 1996.

Career and research
Spaldin was inspired to search for multiferroics, magnetic ferroelectric materials, by a remark about potential collaboration made by a colleague studying ferroelectrics during her postdoctoral research studying magnetic phenomena at Yale University from 1996 to 1997. She continued to develop the theory of these materials as a new faculty member at the University of California, Santa Barbara (UCSB), and in 2000 published (under her previous name, Hill) "a seminal article" that for the first time explained why few such materials were known. Following her theoretical predictions, in 2003 she was part of a team that experimentally demonstrated the multiferroic properties of bismuth ferrite. She moved from UCSB to ETH Zurich in 2010. Her publications are listed on Google scholar.

Awards and honours
Spaldin was the 2010 winner of the American Physical Society's James C. McGroddy Prize for New Materials, the winner of the Rössler Prize of the ETH Zurich Foundation in 2012, the 2015 winner of the Körber European Science Prize for "laying the theoretical foundation for the new family of multiferroic materials".  and one of the laureates of the 2017 L'Oréal-UNESCO Awards for Women in Science.  In November 2017 she was awarded the Lise-Meitner Lectureship of the Austrian and German Physical Societies in Vienna and in 2019 she won the Swiss Science Prize Marcel Benoist. In 2021 she received the IUPAP Magnetism Award and Néel Medal, and in 2022 the Europhysics Prize of the European Physical Society and the Hamburg Prize for Theoretical Physics.

Spaldin is a Fellow of the American Physical Society (2008), the Materials Research Society (2011), the American Association for the Advancement of Science (2013) and the Royal Society (2017), an Honorary Fellow of Churchill College, Cambridge, and a member of  Academia Europaea (2021) and the Swiss Academy of Engineering Sciences (2021). She is a Foreign Associate of the US National Academy of Engineering (2019), the French Academy of Sciences (2021), the Austrian Academy of Sciences (2022) and the German National Academy of Sciences, Leopoldina (2022).

Service 
Spaldin is a member of the ERC Scientific Council and a founding Lead Editor of Physical Review Research.

Teaching 
Spaldin has twice received the ETH Golden Owl Award for Teaching Excellence. She coordinated the revision of her Department's BSc Curriculum in Materials and documented it in a blog. Her textbook on Magnetic Materials is published by Cambridge University Press.

References

External links 
 Nicola Spaldin. Nicola Spaldin’s Blog - Occam's Typewriter

1969 births
Living people
People from Sunderland
British materials scientists
Women materials scientists and engineers
Alumni of the University of Cambridge
University of California, Berkeley alumni
University of California, Santa Barbara faculty
Academic staff of ETH Zurich
Fellows of the American Physical Society
Fellows of the American Association for the Advancement of Science
Members of Academia Europaea
Fellows of Churchill College, Cambridge
L'Oréal-UNESCO Awards for Women in Science laureates
21st-century American women scientists
Female Fellows of the Royal Society
Fellows of the Royal Society
Foreign associates of the National Academy of Engineering
American women academics
American materials scientists